Zenzō, Zenzo or Zenzou is a masculine Japanese given name.

Possible writings
Zenzō can be written using different combinations of kanji characters. Here are some examples:

善三, "virtuous, three"
善蔵, "virtuous, store up"
善造, "virtuous, create"
全三, "all, three"
全蔵, "all, store up"
全造, "all, create"
然三, "so, three"
前三, "in front, three"

The name can also be written in hiragana ぜんぞう or katakana ゼンゾウ.

Notable people with the name
, Japanese writer
, Japanese film director and screenwriter
, Japanese tennis player
Zenzo Yabe (矢部 善蔵, 1852–1910), Japanese educator

Japanese masculine given names